Vilarinho may refer to:

People
Giancarlo Vilarinho (born 1992), Brazilian racing driver
Manuel Vilarinho, Portuguese football president
Manuel Vilarinho (painter) (born 1953), Portuguese painter

Places

Portugal
 Vilarinho (Lousã), a civil parish in the municipality of Lousã
 Vilarinho (Santo Tirso), a civil parish in the municipality of Santo Tirso 
 Vilarinho (Vila Verde), a civil parish in the municipality of Vila Verde
Other variants
 Vilarinho da Castanheira, a parish in the municipality of Carrazeda de Ansiães 
 Vilarinho das Azenhas, a parish in the municipality of Vila Flor
 Vilarinho das Cambas, a parish in the municipality of Vila Nova de Famalicão
 Vilarinho da Furna, a village that was drowned by a dam with same name in Terras de Bouro
 Vilarinho das Paranheiras, a parish in the municipality of Chaves
 Vilarinho de Agrochão, a parish in the municipality of Macedo de Cavaleiros
 Vilarinho de Cotas, a parish in the municipality of Alijó
 Vilarinho de Cova de Lua, a parish in the municipality of Bragança
 Vilarinho de São Romão, a parish in the municipality of Sabrosa 
 Vilarinho de Samardã, a parish in the municipality of Vila Real
 Vilarinho do Monte, a parish in the municipality of Macedo de Cavaleiros 
 Vilarinho do Bairro, a parish in the municipality of Anadia (Portugal)
 Vilarinho dos Freires, a parish in the municipality of Peso da Régua
 Vilarinho dos Galegos, a parish in the municipality of Mogadouro